Mark E'Beyer (born 21 September 1984) is an English former professional footballer who playe for Isthmian League Premier Division side Wealdstone, where he played as a midfielder.

External links
 
 Hitchin Town Player Profile

Living people
1984 births
English footballers
Watford F.C. players
Wimbledon F.C. players
Stevenage F.C. players
Oxford United F.C. players
Hayes F.C. players
Cambridge City F.C. players
Wivenhoe Town F.C. players
Hitchin Town F.C. players
People from Stevenage
English Football League players
Wealdstone F.C. players
Association football midfielders